Fo Halloo was a militant Manx nationalist group active on the Isle of Man in the 1970s. The group conducted Manx graffiti and poster campaigns, published and distributed newsletters, and was also accused of conducting a number of arson attacks against the homes of English, non-Manx residents.

An implication that the Celtic League was involved in the "Manx underground" activities was published by The Guardian in 1976; a refutation from the League chairman was eventually published a month later after ongoing efforts by the League.

See also
Irree Magh, another Manx militant organisation
Ny Troor Tromode
FSFO

References

Anti-English sentiment
Celtic nationalism
Separatism in the Isle of Man
Secessionist organizations in Europe
Manx nationalist parties
Manx words and phrases
1970s in the Isle of Man